Private First Class Whitt Lloyd Moreland (March 7, 1930 – May 29, 1951) was a United States Marine who heroically sacrificed his life to save the lives of fellow Marines by smothering a hand grenade with his body during the UN May–June 1951 counteroffensive of the Korean War. For this action on May 29, 1951, at Kwagch’i-Dong, PFC Moreland was posthumously awarded the United States' highest military decoration — the Medal of Honor. He was the 17th Marine to be awarded the Medal of Honor during the Korean War.

Biography
Born in Waco, Texas on March 7, 1930, Whitt Lloyd Moreland attended public school in Austin, and graduated from Junction High School in 1948, where he played football for two years. In September 1948, he enlisted in the United States Marine Corps for one year, serving in San Diego and Camp Pendleton, California. Upon discharge he enlisted in the Marine Corps Reserve for six years. On November 30, 1950, he was called to active duty, and received advanced training at Camp Pendleton, California.

PFC Moreland was an intelligence scout attached to the 1st Battalion, 5th Marines, 1st Marine Division when he was killed in action at Kwangch'i-Dong, Korea, on May 29, 1951.

Moreland is buried at Whittington Cemetery in Mount Ida, Arkansas.

There is a monument dedicated to him in Llano, Texas along with others who served in the war.

Awards and decorations
PFC Moreland's decorations include:

Medal of Honor citation
The President of the United States takes pride in presenting the MEDAL OF HONOR posthumously to

for service as set forth in the following CITATION:
For conspicuous gallantry and intrepidity at the risk of his life above and beyond the call of duty while serving as an Intelligence Scout attached to Company C, First Battalion, Fifth Marines, First Marine Division (Reinforced), in action against enemy aggressor forces in Korea on May 29, 1951. Voluntarily accompanying a rifle platoon in a daring assault against a strongly defended enemy hill position, Private First Class Moreland delivered accurate rifle fire on the hostile emplacement and thereby aided materially in seizing the objective. After the position had been secured, he unhesitatingly led a party forward to neutralize an enemy bunker which he had observed some 400 meters beyond and, moving boldly through a fireswept area, almost reached the hostile emplacement when the enemy launched a volley of hand grenades on his group. Quick to act despite the personal danger involved, he kicked several of the grenades off the ridgeline where they exploded harmlessly and, while attempting to kick away another, slipped and fell near the deadly missile. Aware that the sputtering grenade would explode before he could regain his feet and dispose of it, he shouted a warning to his comrades, covered the missile with his body and absorbed the full blast of the explosion, but in saving his companions from possible injury or death, was mortally wounded. His heroic initiative and valiant spirit of self-sacrifice in the face of certain death reflect the highest credit upon Private First Class Moreland and the United States Naval Service. He gallantly gave his life for his country.
/S/ HARRY S. TRUMAN

See also

List of Medal of Honor recipients
List of Korean War Medal of Honor recipients

References
Inline

General

Leatherwood, Art. Moreland, Whitt L., Handbook of Texas Online. Retrieved 2006-06-25.

1930 births
1951 deaths
American military personnel killed in the Korean War
United States Marine Corps Medal of Honor recipients
People from Waco, Texas
United States Marines
United States Marine Corps reservists
Korean War recipients of the Medal of Honor
Deaths by hand grenade
United States Marine Corps personnel of the Korean War